Nabih is an Arabic male name meaning "witty, intelligent."

and may refer to:

Persons

Given name
Nabih Berri, Speaker of the Parliament of Lebanon
Nabih Youssef, Egyptian-American structural engineer

Surname
Osama Nabih

Places
Nabih Saleh, an island of Bahrain in Persian Gulf

Business
Nabih's Inc., consumer electronics retailer and information technology consultant in Evanston, Illinois

References 

Arabic-language surnames
Arabic masculine given names